Anbu Thollai is an Indian Tamil action film written and directed by Hayath. The film, which starred Pandiarajan, Ravali and Chinni Jayanth in leading roles, released on 14 February 2003.

Cast
Pandiarajan as Singamuthu
Ravali as Chinnathayi
Chinni Jayanth
R. Sundarrajan as Devarajan
Ganthimathi
Vinu Chakravarthy
Shakeela as Padmini
 Gowthami Vembunathan

Soundtrack
"Mundaasukatti" - Srinivas, Srivardhini
"Kalyanam Unakenna" - Manikka Vinayagam, Nirmala
"Adicha Adikkanum" - Swarnalatha

Release
The film opened to poor reviews, with a critic giving the film "0 stars out of 4", claiming it as "one of the worst Tamil films of the year".

References

2003 films
2000s Tamil-language films